The Piscicolidae are a family of jawless leeches in the order Rhynchobdellida that are parasitic on fish. They occur in both freshwater and seawater, have cylindrical bodies, and typically have a large, bell-shaped, anterior sucker with which they cling to their host. Some of the leeches in this family have external gills, outgrowths of the body wall projecting laterally, the only group of leeches to exchange gases in this way.

Worldwide, around 60 genera and 100 species of leeches are in this family, all parasitic on the blood of marine, estuarine, and freshwater fishes. These leeches are less common in the tropics, and  more abundant in temperate and polar waters.

Taxonomy
Historically, the Piscicolidae have been divided into three subfamilies: the Pontobdellinae, characterised by two pairs of pulsatile vesicles on each urosome segment; the  Pontobdellinae, characterised by a single pair of pulsatile vesicles on each urosome segment; and the Platybdellinae, with no pulsatile vesicles. However, molecular phylogenetic analyses performed by Williams and Burreson in 2006, do not support these subdivisions. The Piscicolidae were confirmed as being monophyletic, but the Platybdellinae were shown to be polyphyletic with four distinct clades, and the Piscicolinae were similarly polyphyletic, again with four distinct clades, and the Pontobdellinae were paraphyletic with respect to the genus Oxytonostoma.

Ecology
The Piscicolidae are parasitic on the blood of fishes. They produce a variety of anticoagulants to help them drink blood freely. Some species are host-specific, while others can accept a larger range of hosts. Some, such as the European Piscicola geometra, take a blood meal and then drop off the host and hide somewhere while they digest the blood; some, mostly in marine or estuarine habitats with soft substrates, attach themselves temporarily to a crustacean after leaving their fish host; others remain attached to a fish semipermanently. Leeches are hermaphrodites, and mating may take place on or off the fish host, but in either case, the cocoon, usually containing a single egg, is deposited elsewhere, usually stuck to a stone or piece of vegetation, or even to the carapace of a crustacean. When the egg hatches, the juvenile leech has about a week to find a suitable fish host for itself.

Selected species
Piscicola geometra
Pontobdella muricata
Trachelobdella lubrica

References

Leeches
Annelid families
Taxa named by George Johnston (naturalist)